Rachael Price (born August 30, 1985) is an Australian-born American jazz and blues singer, known for her work as the lead singer for the band Lake Street Dive. She was born in Sydney, Australia and grew up in Tennessee, graduating from the New England Conservatory of Music. She is the great-granddaughter of Seventh-day Adventist leader George McCready Price, the granddaughter of Hollywood actor John Shelton, and the daughter of composer and conductor Tom Price.

Early life and career
Price was born in Australia and raised in Hendersonville, Tennessee. When she was nine, she performed with The Voices of Baháʼí choir with her sisters Emily and Juliette. At twelve, she was a soloist. The choir toured in India, Europe, South America, Central America, the Caribbean, and Australia. Price has said that she had a large personality as a child and accepted every opportunity to sing.

Price practices the Baháʼí Faith, and explains its influence on her musical career this way:"We believe that music is praise, and that is service, and service is prayer, and so that’s how I think about it . . . I think music is an extremely spiritual art form. I do it for praise and gratitude. That’s what the Faith has taught me about music."She was attracted to jazz at the age of five when she heard Ella Fitzgerald singing "The Lady is a Tramp". She recorded her first album when she was 17. She admires  Bonnie Raitt and Nancy Wilson in part for their longevity in the music business.

In 2003, Price received an honorable mention at the Montreux Jazz Festival's International Jazz Vocal Competition. In 2004, she was a semifinalist and the youngest competitor in the history of the Thelonious Monk Institute Vocal Competition. In August 2004 she made her U.S. jazz festival debut at Yale's Jazz On the Green, where she opened for Joshua Redman.  She won the 2006 Independent Music Award for Best Gospel Song with her recording of "My God, My Adored One" with the Boston Praise Collective. She appeared in concert as a featured vocalist with the T. S. Monk Sextet.

Lake Street Dive
Price performs with Lake Street Dive, a band she started with Michael Calabrese, Bridget Kearney, and Mike (“McDuck”) Olson, who first met as students at the New England Conservatory of Music.

With help from an award by the John Lennon Songwriting Contest, Lake Street Dive recorded  In this episode..., their debut album in 2006. They started touring soon afterwards. Nonesuch released the album Side Pony in February 2016. Their previous album, Bad Self Portraits, was released in February 2014.

Rachael and Vilray
Rachael Price plus the guitarist and singer Vilray also met as students at the New England Conservatory, in 2003. Under the name Rachael and Vilray, the duo perform jazz, pop, and Tin Pan Alley songs from the 1930s and 1940s. Nonesuch released their self-titled first album in 2019.

Hot Tuna
In 2015 Price toured with Hot Tuna on the Jefferson Airplane 50th Anniversary tour. She sang Grace Slick's parts.

Personal life
Price has been married to Canadian singer-songwriter Taylor Ashton since 2019.

Discography

As leader
 Dedicated to You (Claire Vision, 2003)
 From Exile to Exaltation (2006)
 Rachael Price & The Tennessee Terraplanes; Refreshinly Cool (2008)
 The Good Hours (Claire Vision, 2008)
 Rachael & Vilray (Nonesuch, 2019)

With Lake Street Dive
 In This Episode... (FYO Records, 2006)
 Promises, Promises (FYO Records, 2008)
 Lake Street Dive (Signature Sounds, 2010) 
 Fun Machine (Signature, 2012) 
 Bad Self Portraits (Signature, 2014)
 Side Pony (Nonesuch, 2016)
 Free Yourself Up (Nonesuch, 2018)
 Obviously (Nonesuch, 2021)
 Fun Machine: The Sequel (Signature, 2022)

Video
 Live at the Lizard Lounge (2011)

References

External links 
 Lake Street Dive
 Rachael & Vilray

Living people
1985 births
People from Hendersonville, Tennessee
Jazz musicians from Tennessee
New England Conservatory alumni
American jazz singers
American women jazz singers
21st-century American singers
Independent Music Awards winners
21st-century American women singers
Lake Street Dive members
The Fundies members
Australian jazz singers
21st-century Australian singers
American Bahá'ís
Australian Bahá'ís
Australian emigrants to the United States
Musicians from Perth, Western Australia